Le Déchaussé  is a 2002 film. It completes Laurence Attali's Trilogy of Love. The first two films were Même le Vent (1999) and Baobab (2000).

Synopsis 

Everything started at the lighthouse bar, during Booz's concert. Ben, the trumpet player, dies onstage. The next day, his wife Esther places Ben's trumpet on his grave and taking Booz's hand, she says: "Now you must take care of me".

Awards 
 Beaumarchais, Dakar 2003
 Reus 2004
 Roma Stelle del Deserto 2004

External links 

 

2002 films
French short films
Senegalese short films